Thomas Harries may refer to:
 Sir Thomas Harries, 1st Baronet, English lawyer and politician
 Thomas M. Harries, Scottish World War I flying ace